The BYD Frigate 07 (比亚迪护卫舰07) is a mid-size crossover SUV manufactured by Chinese automaker BYD Auto. The second plug-in hybrid electric vehicle (PHEV) or Extended Range EV (EREV) of BYD's new "Ocean Series" of plug-in electric vehicles, the Frigate 07 is equipped with the DM-i hybrid technology shared with the BYD Destroyer 05, and the additional DM-p performance oriented hybrid technology from the PHEVs of the BYD Dynasty series.

Overview

First previewed by the BYD X Dream concept car at the Shanghai Auto Show on April 20, 2021, the BYD Frigate 07 production version was unveiled at the Chengdu Auto Show in August 2022, with the market launch held in December 2022. The Frigate 07 is the second vehicle of BYDs Warship-series, which comprises PHEVs from the Ocean-Series NEVs. Charging the Frigate 07 can be done either through a normal household AC plug at 3.3 kW and the all wheel drive version supports a faster 6.6 kW AC charging. All versions of the Frigate 07 support DC fast charging at either 40 kW or 75 kW respectively. The Vehicle-to-Load is supported by all versions of the Frigate 07 and offers up to 6.6 kW.

The interior of the Frigate 07 is equipped with a  rotating main screen, 360-degree HD cameras, and app-controlled autonomous parking. Just like the one on the Destroyer 05, The 15.6 inch main touch screen can rotate from landscape to portrait.

The Frigate 07 supports the iPhone NFC digital key and also comes with the DiPilot intelligent driving assistance system that provides users with advanced driving-assisting functions including active braking, maintaining lanes, adaptive cruise control, and pedestrian recognition and protection. The Frigate 07 is also the first model from BYD to be equipped with the FSD frequency variable damping dampers and four-link independent rear suspensions.

Powertrain
The BYD Frigate 07 is powered by BYD's DM-i and DM-p hybrid EHS system (Electric Hybrid System)  in two variants with two battery sizes respectively. Both DM-i and DM-p versions are fitted with a 102 kW and 231Nm 1.5-litre turbo-charged Xiaoyun Miller cycle petrol engine producing  and a 60-liter fuel tank giving the car a combined range of over 1,200 km and a fuel economy of 5.5L/100 km. The all wheel drive DM-p version has a 0 to 100 km/h acceleration time of 4.7 seconds, while the front wheel drive DM-i model accelerates from 0 to 100 km/h in 8.5 seconds.

See also
 BYD Destroyer 05

References

Frigate 07
Plug-in hybrid vehicles
Partial zero-emissions vehicles
Cars introduced in 2022
Crossover sport utility vehicles
Cars of China
Production electric cars